Mob Boss is a 1990 direct-to-video Mafia-themed comedy film directed by Fred Olen Ray and starring Eddie Deezen, Morgan Fairchild, Teagan Clive and William Hickey.

The film features character actor Deezen in one of his few leading roles, as well as guest appearances from many veteran character actors known for their "tough guy" and gangster roles, including Mike Mazurki in his final screen appearance.

Plot summary
Don Anthony (William Hickey) is the head of California's largest crime family. Unbeknownst to him, his voluptuous mistress Gina (Morgan Fairchild) and his arch-rival Don Francisco (Stuart Whitman) have plotted a hostile takeover of the business, and Don Anthony is gunned down following a mob meeting. Lying mortally wounded in the hospital, Don Anthony directs his chief lieutenant Monk (Irwin Keyes) to locate his estranged son Tony to assume the family business and carry on the Anthony name.

Unfortunately for the family, Tony (Eddie Deezen) is a wimpy nerd with no idea of the true nature of his father's business. As Monk tries to transform the milquetoast geek into a fearsome gangster, Don Francisco attempts to overthrow him through Gina's powers of seduction, while a pair of bumbling hitmen (Brinke Stevens and Jack O'Halloran) try to bump Tony off at every turn.

Cast
Eddie Deezen as Tony Anthony
William Hickey as Don Anthony
Morgan Fairchild as Gina
Stuart Whitman as Don Francisco
Jack O'Halloran as Angelo
Irwin Keyes as Monk
Don Stroud as Legrand
Joe Zimmerman as Dino
Brinke Stevens as Sara
Dick Miller as Mike
Mike Mazurki as Don Taglianeti
Len Lesser as Don Caglianoti
Vince Barbi as Don Rigatoni
Leo Gordon as Don O'Reily
Jay Richardson as Tom Peck
Robert Quarry as Dr. Jones (credited as Darius Beiderbeck)

Production
The film starred Eddie Deezen who had previously worked with Fred Olen Ray on Beverly Hills Vamp. "I love Fred," said Deezen said the film was "so much fun to shoot. I had a ball. Morgan Fairchild, a lovely lady."

Reception
Professional reviews of Mob Boss were moderately negative. Entertainment Weekly gave the film a "C−" rating, writing "This mostly rotten comedy from bad-movie king Fred Olen Ray (Hollywood Chainsaw Hookers) offers amazingly low-brow slapstick, but the cast has fun (especially Morgan Fairchild, of all people) and the liberal use of boingy sound effects makes for a few silly laughs". Allmovie gave the film 1.5 out of 5 stars without a written review.

References

External links

1990 films
1990s parody films
1990s crime comedy films
American crime comedy films
American parody films
1990s English-language films
Mafia comedy films
Films directed by Fred Olen Ray
1990 comedy films
1990s American films